The Front of Democratic Forces is a political party in Morocco.

History and profile
The party was founded in 1997 as a split from the Party of Progress and Socialism. It has a socialist political leaning.

In the parliamentary election held on 27 September 2002, the party won 12 out of 325 seats. In the next parliamentary election, held on 7 September 2007, the party won 9 out of 325 seats. In the parliamentary election of 2011, the party won only 1 seat out of 395. 

The party has an Arabic publication, Al Mounataf.

References

1997 establishments in Morocco
Political parties established in 1997
Political parties in Morocco
Socialist parties in Morocco